The men's 10,000 metres track walk at the 1950 European Athletics Championships was held in Brussels, Belgium, at Heysel Stadium.

Medalists

Results

Final
24 August

Participation
According to an unofficial count, 13 athletes from 7 countries participated in the event.

 (2)
 (2)
 (2)
 (1)
 (2)
 (2)
 (2)

References

10,000 metres track walk
Racewalking at the European Athletics Championships